Muhammad Shahbaz (born January 12, 1972), known as Shahbaz Junior, is a hockey player from Pakistan who took part in the 1992 and 1996 Olympics.

References

External links
 
Players who represented Pakistan

Living people
Olympic medalists in field hockey
Pakistani male field hockey players
Field hockey players at the 1992 Summer Olympics
Field hockey players at the 1996 Summer Olympics
Medalists at the 1992 Summer Olympics
Olympic field hockey players of Pakistan
1998 Men's Hockey World Cup players
People from Toba Tek Singh District
Asian Games medalists in field hockey
Field hockey players at the 1994 Asian Games
Asian Games bronze medalists for Pakistan
Medalists at the 1994 Asian Games
Olympic bronze medalists for Pakistan
20th-century Pakistani people
1972 births